Thirupuvanam may refer to:

 Thirupuvanam, Thanjavur
 Thirupuvanam, Sivaganga